Malik Beyleroğlu (born January 21, 1970) is a former amateur boxer from Turkey(Azerbaijani origin), born in the Azerbaijan Soviet Socialist Republic, Soviet Union. At the 1996 Summer Olympics, he won the silver medal in the men's middleweight division (71 – 75 kg). In the final, he was defeated by Ariel Hernández of Cuba.

Holding a PhD in sports, Beyleroğlu is currently a lecturer for physical education and sports at Sakarya University.

Olympic results 
 1st round bye
 Defeated Zsolt Erdei (Hungary) 9-8
 Defeated Thamwisai Wangsomnuk (Thailand) 16-12
 Defeated Mohamed Bahari (Algeria) 11-11, referee's decision
 Lost to Ariel Hernández (Cuba) 3-11

References

External links
 

1970 births
Living people
Azerbaijani emigrants to Turkey
Middleweight boxers
Olympic silver medalists for Turkey
Olympic boxers of Turkey
Boxers at the 1996 Summer Olympics
Academic staff of Sakarya University
Place of birth missing (living people)
Olympic medalists in boxing
Turkish male boxers
Medalists at the 1996 Summer Olympics
Competitors at the 1993 Mediterranean Games
Competitors at the 1997 Mediterranean Games
Mediterranean Games silver medalists for Turkey
Mediterranean Games bronze medalists for Turkey
Mediterranean Games medalists in boxing